Tompkins Falls is a waterfall in Delaware County, New York. It is located southwest of Arena on Barkaboom Stream.

References

Waterfalls of New York (state)
Landforms of Delaware County, New York
Tourist attractions in Delaware County, New York